The epoöphoron lies in the mesosalpinx between the ovary and the uterine tube, and consists of a few short tubules, the ductuli transversi which converge toward the ovary while their opposite ends open into a rudimentary duct, the ductus longitudinalis epoöphori (duct of Gärtner).

The ductuli transversi of the epoophoron is a remnant of the tubules of the Wolffian body or mesonephros.

References 

Mammal female reproductive system